Vice Admiral Muzzafar Hassan (b. 1920–24 May 2012) , was a Pakistan Navy senior admiral who served as the last Commander-in-Chief of Pakistan Navy from 1969 until 1972, serving under first President Yahya Khan and then under President Zulfikar Ali Bhutto.

He is notable for commanding the Pakistan Navy in naval events in the war with India in 1971 and was dismissed from his military service and relieved from the command of the Navy over the allegations proved in the light of War Enquiry Commission by the Judge Advocate General of Navy. His termination came along with the commanders of army, Lieutenant-General Gul Hassan and air force Air Marshal A.R. Khan in 1972. He was succeeded by the Vice-Admiral Hasan Hafeez Ahmed following his termination.

Biography

Muzzafar Hassan was born in Lucknow, Uttar Pradesh, British India, in 1920  and it is known very little of his early life that is primarily sourced from the military literature published on combined military histories of India and Pakistan.

After attending the Rashtriya Indian Military College (RIMC), he gained commissioned as a Midshipman in the Royal Indian Navy in 1941 in the Executive Branch. He participated in the World War II as an officer in the Royal Indian Navy on the behalf of the United Kingdom on the European front, and was sent to attend the Britannia Royal Naval College after the end of World War II in 1945. After graduating in the staff course degree, he returned to British India and subsequently promoted as Lieutenant in the Royal Indian Navy and decided to opt for Pakistan as an aftermath of partition of British India, also the same year. Hassan was among the first twenty naval officers who decided to join the Royal Pakistan Navy (RPN) as a Lieutenant with a Service number PN.0073 that was listed in the seniority list sent by the Royal Indian Navy to Pakistan's Ministry of Defence.  He was said to be an excellent hockey player in the navy where he captained the navy's hockey team against the Indian Navy's hockey team; the RPN's hockey team won by a margin of five goals to one secured against RIN's team.

In 1952, he was promoted as Commander and commanded the destroyer, the PNS Tughril along with PNS Tippu Sultan commanded by Captain M.A. Alvi. There, he accompanied Governor of Punjab, Abdur Rab Nishtar, on a Hajj mission led by Pakistan Navy in Mecca, Saudi Arabia. His career in the Navy progressed in the 1960s when he was promoted as Rear-Admiral in 1965 after participating in the second war with India.

In 1967, he was appointed as Commander of Western Naval Command and Commander Karachi (COMKAR) in 1968 at the Navy NHQ. In 1969, his nomination to command the Navy was approved when Admiral S.M. Ahsan was promoted as Governor of East Pakistan with a promotion to the rank as Vice-Admiral. As Commander-in-Chief of Navy, he frequently paid visit to East Pakistan to review the operational readiness of the Navy in 1969–71. During this time, he also served as military adviser to the Southeast Asia Treaty Organization (SEATO).

In 1971, he led the Pakistan Navy against the Indian Navy but the war ended with the devastating effects on Pakistan Navy which lost the number of warships off the coast of Karachi with no cover from the Pakistan Air Force (PAF). The Navy NHQ was located in Karachi which came under intense attacks by the Indian Navy and the Indian Air Force which crippled the Navy. The casualties inflicted to Navy included the 408 personnel dead at sea and ~3,000 personnels including 1300 naval officers were held as prisoners of war. Many of his requests to retaliate against the Indian Navy were rebuffed by the Air Marshal Abdul Rahim Khan who reportedly quoted: "Well, old boy, this happens in war. I am sorry your ships have been sunk. We shall try to do something in the future."

After the war, he was subsequently dismissed from his military service and relieved from the command of the Navy on 22 December 1971 along with the chiefs of army and the air force. He, along with Lieutenant-General Gul Hassan and Air Marshal Abdul Rahim Khan were forcefully retired from their commission on 3 March 1972 in a stand up military trial led by the combined JAG Branch.

After his dismissal from the military service, Hassan permanently settled in DHA Society in Karachi and was the first president of the Defence Society Residents Association (DSRA)–a neighborhood watch– from 1981 to 1990. Throughout his retirement, he avoided the news media to offer any comments on the fall of Dhaka and died of an old age from a prolonged illness and died on 24 June 2012. The news of his death went unnoticed in the media and was buried in Karachi War Cemetery.

References

External links
Official website of Pakistan Navy

1920 births
2012 deaths
Military personnel from Lucknow
Rashtriya Indian Military College alumni
Indian military personnel of World War II
Royal Indian Navy officers
Graduates of Britannia Royal Naval College
Muhajir people
Pakistan Navy admirals
Chiefs of Naval Staff (Pakistan)
Admirals of the Indo-Pakistani War of 1971
Military personnel from Karachi